Nicky "Nick" Gedney is a English former professional darts player who competed in British Darts Organisation (BDO) and Professional Darts Corporation (PDC) tournaments.

Career
Gedney was one of eight qualifiers who took part in the 1994 BDO World Darts Championship and caused a major shock in the first round, coming from two sets down to beat number one seed Steve Beaton 3-2, hitting checkouts of 161 and 158 in the process, with the 161 being the highest checkout of the tournament. He eventually lost in the second round to Kevin Kenny. He returned to Lakeside seven years later in the 2001 BDO World Darts Championship, but lost in the first round to Peter Hinkley. Gedney also reached the final of the 2000 Swiss Open, with notable wins over Mervyn King, Andy Smith and Ronnie Baxter before losing to Raymond van Barneveld.

World Championship results

BDO
 1994: Last 16: (lost to Kevin Kenny 2–3; sets)
 2001: Last 32: (lost to Peter Hinkley 1–3)

External links
Profile at Darts Database

English darts players
Living people
Place of birth missing (living people)
British Darts Organisation players
Year of birth missing (living people)